David Morris Aaronovitch (born 8 July 1954) is an English journalist, television presenter and author. He is a regular columnist for The Times and the author of Paddling to Jerusalem: An Aquatic Tour of Our Small Country (2000), Voodoo Histories: the role of Conspiracy Theory in Modern History (2009) and Party Animals: My Family and Other Communists (2016). He won the Orwell Prize for political journalism in 2001, and the What the Papers Say "Columnist of the Year" award for 2003. He previously wrote for The Independent and The Guardian.

Early life and education
Aaronovitch is the son of communist intellectual and economist Sam Aaronovitch, and brother of actor Owen Aaronovitch and author and screenwriter Ben Aaronovitch. His parents were atheists whose "faith was Marxism", according to Aaronovitch, and he is ethnically half Jewish and half Irish. He has written that he was brought up "to react to wealth with a puritanical pout".

Aaronovitch attended Gospel Oak Primary School until 1965, Holloway County Comprehensive (now Holloway School) until 1968, and William Ellis School from 1968 to 1972, all in London. He studied Modern History at Balliol College, Oxford. Aaronovitch completed his education at the Victoria University of Manchester, graduating in 1978 with a 2:1 BA (Hons) in History.

While at Manchester, Aaronovitch was a member of the 1975 University Challenge team that lost in the first round after answering most questions with the name of a Marxist ("Trotsky", "Lenin", "Karl Marx" or "Che Guevara"). The tactics were a protest against the fact that the University of Oxford and Cambridge University were allowed to enter each of their colleges into the contest as a separate team, even though the colleges were not universities in themselves.

Aaronovitch was initially a Eurocommunist, and was active in the National Union of Students (NUS). There he got to know the president at the time, Charles Clarke, who later became Home Secretary. Aaronovitch himself succeeded Trevor Phillips as president of the NUS from 1980 to 1982. He was elected on a Left Alliance ticket.

Career in journalism 
Aaranovitch began his media career in the early 1980s as a television researcher and later producer for the ITV programme Weekend World. In 1988, he began working at the BBC as founding editor of the political current affairs programme On the Record.

He moved to print journalism in 1995, working for The Independent and The Independent on Sunday as chief leader writer, television critic, parliamentary sketch writer and columnist until the end of 2002.

He began contributing to The Guardian and The Observer in 2003 as a columnist and feature writer. Aaronovitch's columns appeared in The Guardians G2 section. His desire for his pieces to appear on the main comment pages, according to Peter Wilby, was reportedly vetoed by the section editor, Seumas Milne, although Aaronovitch himself does not know if Milne was involved in the decision. Since June 2005, he has written a regular column for The Times. He has also been a columnist for The Jewish Chronicle. In addition, Aaronovitch has written for a variety of other major British news and opinion publications, such as the New Statesman. In addition, he has written for New Humanist, and is an "honorary associate" of its publisher, the Rationalist Association.

Aaronovitch also presents or contributes to radio and television programmes, including the BBC's Have I Got News for You and BBC News 24. In 2004 he presented The Norman Way, a three-part BBC Radio 4 documentary looking at régime change in 1066.

Aaronovitch also hosted the BBC series The Blair Years (2007), which examined the prime ministership of Tony Blair. Some journalists were unimpressed with Aaronovitch or dismissed the series.

Political views 

In late 2005, Aaronovitch was co-author, with Oliver Kamm and journalist Francis Wheen, of a complaint to The Guardian, after it published an apology to Noam Chomsky for an interview by Emma Brockes, in which she asserted that Chomsky had denied the Srebrenica massacre. A Guardian readers' editor found that the newspaper had misrepresented Chomsky's position on the Srebrenica massacre, and that judgement was upheld in May 2006 by an external ombudsman, John Willis.

In his column of 5 September 2013, Aaronovitch criticized the Labour leader Ed Miliband for allegedly providing no alternative to military intervention in Syria, after the use of chemical weapons in the Ghouta attacks of 21 August 2013. For Aaronovitch, "politically [Miliband] is not a presence at all, he is an absence" and "is neither hunter nor prey, he is scavenger. He is a political vulture."

During 2013, Aaronovitch became the chairman of the human rights organisation Index on Censorship, succeeding Jonathan Dimbleby in the role.

In May 2014, he criticised Glenn Greenwald's involvement in the Edward Snowden NSA revelations, and characterised Greenwald as "a stilted writer of overlong, dishonest and repetitive polemics."

In August 2014, Aaronovitch was one of 200 public figures who were signatories to a letter to The Guardian expressing their hope that Scotland would vote to remain part of the United Kingdom in September's referendum on that issue.

In 2016, he endorsed the United Kingdom's continued membership of the European Union in the 23 June referendum. Aaronovitch later said that Brexit would eventually be reversed as the number of older voters, who typically voted for Britain to leave the European Union, gradually die.

Personal life

Aaronovitch lives in London with his wife and three daughters. He is a supporter of Tottenham Hotspur Football Club and has a keen interest in collecting leather jackets.

In 2011, Aaronovitch was the victim of a "medical accident" following routine surgery. He survived septicemia thanks to antibiotics, a treatment that was not available to his grandmother, who died of an infection following an insect bite in 1930. This experience led him to become an advocate for Antibiotic Research UK and the charity's work to promote proper antibiotic use and the development of new antibiotics.

Works 
Paddling to Jerusalem: An Aquatic Tour of Our Small Country (Fourth Estate, 2000) 
No Excuses for Terror, a 45-minute documentary film that "criticizes how the anti-Israel views of the far-left and far-right have permeated the mainstream media and political discourse."
Blaming the Jews, a 45-minute documentary film that evaluates anti-Semitism in Arab media and culture.
God and the Politicians, 28 September 2005, a documentary film that looks at the important question of the increasing religious influence on politics in the UK
Voodoo Histories: The Role of Conspiracy Theory in Shaping Modern History, Jonathan Cape, 2009,  Published in the US in 2010 by Riverhead Books, 
Party Animals: My Family and Other Communists. Jonathan Cape, 2016.

References

External links 

David Aaronovitch on Twitter
David Aaronovitch's Guardian; columns
 David Aaronovitch column in The Times

Interview with Aaronovitch on "New Books in History"
David Aaronovitch blog

1954 births
Living people
Alumni of Balliol College, Oxford
Alumni of the Victoria University of Manchester
BBC newsreaders and journalists
Contestants on University Challenge
Critics of conspiracy theories
English columnists
English communists
English humanists
English male journalists
English people of Irish descent
English people of Jewish descent
Former Marxists
People educated at Holloway School
People educated at William Ellis School
People from Hampstead
Presidents of the National Union of Students (United Kingdom)